Helvibotys pucilla is a moth in the family Crambidae first described by Herbert Druce in 1895. It is found in Guatemala, Costa Rica, the Mexican state of Veracruz and the United States, where it has been recorded from Kentucky, Oklahoma and Texas

The wingspan is 15–18 mm. The forewings and hindwings of the males are uniform brownish yellow. The male's forewings are black in the basal quarter and the distal half, leaving a broad yellow band in the median area. The hindwings are yellow, except for a broad black terminal band. Adults have been recorded on wing from May to August.

References

Moths described in 1895
Pyraustinae